Dhanki is a Bhil language of India, sometimes classified as a dialect of Khandeshi.

References

Hindi languages
Bhil